The Wiedersberger Horn  is a mountain in the Alpbachtal valley in Austria. The Wiedersberger Horn is accessible from the Alpbachtal via cableways and the mountainsides are used as a skiing area. In winter it may be climbed without difficulty in safe snow conditions. From the top station of the highest lift in the ski area (2,025 m) there is a path to the summit facilitated by step-like wooden beams.

On the wooden summit cross is a plaque with the inscription:

References

Mountains of the Alps
Mountains of Tyrol (state)
Two-thousanders of Austria
Kitzbühel Alps